Truncattus is a genus of Caribbean jumping spiders that was first described by J. X. Zhang & Wayne Paul Maddison in 2012.

Species
 it contains five species, found only in the Dominican Republic, Haiti, and on the Greater Antilles:
Truncattus cachotensis Zhang & Maddison, 2012 – Hispaniola
Truncattus dominicanus Zhang & Maddison, 2012 – Hispaniola
Truncattus flavus Zhang & Maddison, 2012 (type) – Hispaniola
Truncattus manni (Bryant, 1943) – Hispaniola (Haiti)
Truncattus mendicus (Bryant, 1943) – Hispaniola (Dominican Rep.)

References

Salticidae genera
Salticidae
Spiders of the Caribbean